Caeneressa everetti is a moth of the family Erebidae. It was described by Rothschild in 1910. It is found on Borneo and the Natuna Islands. The habitat consists of lowland forests, including alluvial forests.

References

Syntomini
Moths described in 1910